The Women's 5,000m event at the 2010 South American Games was held on March 22 at 17:45.

Medalists

Records

Results
Results were published.

†: Karina Villazana from  Perú was initially 2nd in 17:24.31, but was disqualified, because being tested positive for cocaine abuse.

Intermediate times:

See also
2010 South American Under-23 Championships in Athletics

References

External links
Report

5000 W